Joe Casey (19 April 1937 – 21 March 2009) was an Irish boxer. He competed in the men's heavyweight event at the 1960 Summer Olympics. At the 1960 Summer Olympics, he lost in his opening fight to Obrad Sretenovic of Yugoslavia.

References

External links
 

1937 births
2009 deaths
Irish male boxers
Olympic boxers of Ireland
Boxers at the 1960 Summer Olympics
Sportspeople from County Limerick
Heavyweight boxers